Willard Cleveland O'Brien (December 15, 1893 – November 6, 1981) was a physician and political figure in Nova Scotia, Canada.

Early life and education
Born in Noel, Nova Scotia, he graduated from Dalhousie Medical School in 1919.

Political career
He served as the mayor of Wedgeport, Nova Scotia from 1936 to 1942 and he represented Yarmouth County in the Nova Scotia House of Assembly from 1956 to 1963 as a Liberal member. He ran for reelection in 1963 but lost by 165 votes to George A. Burridge.

Personal life
He was married to Marguerite (Murphy), sister of Walter Murphy, who served as the last mayor of Wedgeport.

References

1893 births
1981 deaths
Nova Scotia Liberal Party MLAs
People from Hants County, Nova Scotia
Physicians from Nova Scotia
Dalhousie University alumni